Whiteadder Reservoir is a reservoir in East Lothian, Scotland, UK, in the Lammermuir Hills,  north west of Duns in the Scottish Borders, and five miles (8 km) south east of Garvald.  It was created to provide additional water facilities for East Lothian.

Work on the Dam forming the reservoir commenced in 1964.  Design was carried out by consulting civil engineers GH Hill & Sons of Manchester and London, on behalf of the then local water authority - East Lothian Water Board.   The flooding ceremony was in May 1968. Millknowe Farm and Kingside School were flooded.

Whiteadder reservoir supplies East Lothian and Berwickshire, including the former Cockenzie Power Station on the northern coast of East Lothian,  the Whiteadder Water flows out of the reservoir and is the lowest tributary of the River Tweed which it enters at Berwick-on-Tweed.

Data
Capacity: 
Surface: 

Although the reservoir and the Outdoor Education Centre are in East Lothian, it has been managed by the Outdoor Education department of Scottish Borders Council for over 20 years. Through a partnership between East Lothian Council, Scottish Borders Council and Borders Sailing Club, funds were obtained for a major refurbishment, and the new Centre was opened in 2005.

The centre was mothballed in 2017 due to funding cuts but is to reopen in April 2021 under the auspices of a charity set up by sailing instructors who previously worked at the centre.

Courses will recommence in April 2021 but swimming events and some other non-sailing activities may start earlier.

Fly-Fishing for the Reservoir's native brown trout will restart in April 2021 for the season (until 30/09/21). Bait fishing and spinning are not allowed by order of the reservoir owner, Scottish Water.

The charity's objective is to retain the strong natural feel of the location while making the most of it for teaching people how to enjoy a range of water-based activities safely and expertly.

Antiquities

Prehistoric settlement in the area is represented by the Friar's Nose, a multivallate promontory fort immediately east of the reservoir. 
Directly across the Whiteadder valley from the fort, to the north-east of the reservoir, traces of a prehistoric settlement and field system have been recorded.

Penshiel Grange is a ruin located to the southeast of the reservoir. It was a monastic grange attached to Melrose Abbey and was probably built in the first half of the 15th century, though there is reference to Penshiel in a charter of 1200. Penshiel Grange is protected as a scheduled monument. There are some traces of a tower at the south-east corner, and some evidence of a courtyard to the north and south of the ruin, with the wall on the south of the main building, now being merely a turf-covered stony bank. There were at least two building to the north, one of which may have been a chapel.

The lands of Gamelshiel were held by the Forrest family in the 16th century, and by the Homes in the 17th century. The fragmentary ruin comprises the east and west walls of a small tower house, built in the 16th century. The height and appearance of the tower are uncertain, though there is evidence of a vaulted cellar.

To the west of the reservoir is the "Packman's Grave", a setting of stones said to mark the burial-place of a murdered packman.

Photo gallery

See also
List of reservoirs and dams in the United Kingdom
List of places in East Lothian

References

External links
Packman's Grave
Advisory Visit to the Whiteadder Angling Association Waters on 18 June 2006

Reservoirs in East Lothian